The 1988–89 Eintracht Frankfurt season was the 89th season in the club's football history. In 1988–89 the club played in the Bundesliga, the top tier of German football. It was the club's 26th season in the Bundesliga.

Matches

Legend

Friendlies

Bundesliga

League fixtures and results

Relegation play-offs

League table

Results summary

Results by round

DFL-Supercup

DFB-Pokal

European Cup Winners' Cup

Indoor soccer tournaments

Stuttgart

Frankfurt

DFB-Hallenpokal in Dortmund

Squad

Squad and statistics

|}

Transfers

In:

Out:

Notes

Sources

External links
 Official English Eintracht website 
 German archive site 

1988–89
German football clubs 1988–89 season